Grosser or Großer is the masculine nominative singular form of the German adjective "gross", meaning "big", "great", "large", "tall", and the like. It is part of many placenames, especially of mountains. It is also a surname. People with that surname include:

 Alfred Grosser (born 1925), German-French writer, sociologist, and political scientist
 Arthur Grosser (active from 1987), Canadian physical chemist and actor
 Peter Grosser (1938–2021), German football player and coach
 Philip Grosser (1890–1933), Ukrainian-American anarchist and anti-militarist
 Thomas Grosser (1965–2008), German footballer
 Pamela Grosser (born 1977), German actress

See also
 Gross (disambiguation)
 Groser
 
 

Surnames of German origin